FRAD may refer to:

 Frame Relay assembler/disassembler
 Functional Requirements for Authority Data
 Republican Front for Democratic Change; see Jean-Marie Doré
 FRAD, postnominal for Fellow of the Royal Academy of Dance